Gyeyang station is the northern terminus of Line 1 of the Incheon Subway. It is also a railway station on the AREX, a railway linking Seoul Station and Incheon International Airport.

In 2007, station for Incheon subway line opened and then AREX opened on March 23.

Station layout

Vicinity

Exit 1 : Gyeyang Elementary & Middle Schools

References

Metro stations in Incheon
Railway stations opened in 2007
Seoul Metropolitan Subway stations
Gyeyang District